The Office of the Government Economist (OGE), formerly known as the Economic Analysis and Business Facilitation Unit, of the Hong Kong government was formed under the Financial Secretary's Office on 1 June 2004, when the HKSAR Government merged the Economic Analysis Division (under the Financial Services Branch of the Financial Services and the Treasury Bureau) and the Business Facilitation Division (previously under the Commerce and Industry Branch of the Commerce, Industry and Technology Bureau).

References

External links 
Economic Analysis and Business Facilitation Unit   

Hong Kong government departments and agencies
Ministries established in 2004